Charles Behan may refer to:

 Charlie Behan (1920–1945), American football player and Navy Cross recipient
 Petie Behan (1887–1957), Major League Baseball pitcher